Tim Quill (October 18, 1962 - September 25, 2017)  Born and raised in Wilmington, Delaware, Quill relocated to New York City in the 1980s to pursue acting, and was trained at the William Esper Acting Studio.

Quill made his debut in the Vietnam War set Hamburger Hill playing the role of Pvt. Joe Beletsky, following it up with roles in the films Listen to Me, Hiding Out, Next of Kin, and Argo.

Quill made numerous appearances in various television series including Miami Vice (episode 5x18), in 1989, ER in 1997, and a recurring role as Lt. Mason Painter in JAG. He appeared in the Sliders episode, Prophets and Loss (1998).

Quill died of cancer on September 25, 2017, at the age of 54. He is survived by his son, and predeceased by his wife Lisa Casanova Quill, who had died at age 46, seven years before of breast cancer. They were interred at Wilmington & Brandywine Cemetery in Wilmington.

Filmography

References

External links
Tim Quill at the Internet Movie Database
Tim Quill at Find-A-Grave

1962 births
2017 deaths
American male television actors
Burials in Delaware
Deaths from cancer in Delaware
Male actors from Wilmington, Delaware